Governing is a website, edited and published in Washington, D.C., that covers state and local government in the United States. Originally a national monthly magazine, it was published in print from 1987 to 2019. It covers policy, politics, and the management of government enterprises. Its subject areas include government finance, land use, economic development, the environment, technology, and transportation.

History
For most of its life, Governing was published by Washington, D.C.–based Congressional Quarterly, Inc., a subsidiary of the Times Publishing Co. of St. Petersburg, Florida. In 1994, Governing acquired its primary competitor, City & State magazine, and that publication was merged into Governing. In 2009, it was sold to e.Republic.

On August 7, 2019, the magazine announced that it would discontinue publication, with its September 2019 issue its last print edition. At first, it announced an intention to close its website and other operations. However, it later relaunched as a website with a new focus: "what state and local government looks like in a world of rapidly advancing technology." The website adopted a new subtitle, renaming itself Governing: The Future of States and Localities.

References

External links
 Governing.com (official site)

Monthly magazines published in the United States
Defunct political magazines published in the United States
Magazines established in 1987
Magazines disestablished in 2019
Magazines published in Washington, D.C.
Online magazines with defunct print editions